Spiros Stathoulopoulos (born 1978) is a Greek-Colombian film director best known for the uncut cult film PVC-1 (2007) and Meteora (2012).

PVC-1 competed for the Camera d'Or at the 60th Cannes Film Festival in the Directors' Fortnight section and won numerous international awards including the FIPRESCI Prize at the Thessaloniki International Film Festival.

Meteora, his second film, was nominated for the Golden Bear at the 62nd Berlin International Film Festival in February 2012.

References

External links

1978 births
Living people
Greek film directors
Colombian people of Greek descent